Argonne Township is a defunct civil township in Adams County, North Dakota, United States. The 1960 census recorded a population of 90.

The township dissolved prior to the 1980 Census, when it was combined with Holt Township to form the Census-designated Central Adams Unorganized Territory. As of the 2000 Census, the combined area had a population of 64.

References

External links
 
 Official 1968 Adams County, North Dakota Farm & Ranch Directory Directory Service Company Provided by Farm and Home, 1968

Adams County
Defunct townships in Adams County, North Dakota